4over6 is an IPv6 transition technology. It is intended as a mechanism for Internet service providers to provide continued access to the IPv4 Internet over an IPv6-only service provider infrastructure.
There are currently two versions of the protocol: Public 4over6 which is deployed but not recommended for new implementations, and Lightweight 4over6 which is an extension to the Dual-Stack Lite architecture.

References

External links 
 Lightweight 4over6 Efforts Debuted at IETF 85: An IPv4 Service Continuity Solution for Smooth IPv6 Transition
 
 
 "Comparison of IPv4-over-IPv6 (4over6) and Dual Stack Technologies in Dynamic Configuration for IPv4/IPv6 Address" in 

IPv6 transition technologies